Garlieston is the closed terminus of the Garlieston branch of Wigtownshire Railway; running from a junction at Millisle. It served the coastal village and harbour of Garlieston in Wigtownshire.  The Garlieston branch, together with the rest of the Wigtownshire Railway, closed completely in 1964.

Services
The branch opened from Millisle to Garlieston on 3 April 1876 for both goods and passengers.

Regular passenger services ceased on the Garlieston branch on 1 March 1903.  However, Garlieston had a good harbour and it occasionally ran boat excursions to the Isle of Man. These were well patronised, so the railway continued to provide excursion trains to Garlieston until 1935. 

Goods services ran from Newton Stewart to Whithorn and to Garlieston until the Whithorn branch closed completely on 5 October 1964. By the 1960s, these services ran three days per week; with conditional working on the Garlieston branch, when required.

See also
 List of closed railway stations in Britain

References

Notes

Sources

External links
 Disused stations

Disused railway stations in Dumfries and Galloway
Former Portpatrick and Wigtownshire Joint Railway stations
Railway stations in Great Britain opened in 1876
Railway stations in Great Britain closed in 1903
Railway stations serving harbours and ports in the United Kingdom